Volcineț is the Romanian name for several places in Chernivtsi Oblast in Ukraine:

Volcineț, Stary Vovchynets, Chernivysi Raion
Volcineț, Vovchynets, a village in Lukivtsi, Vyzhnytsia Raion
Volcineți, Vovchynets, Dnistrovskyi Raion, Chernivtsi Oblast
Volcinețul Nou, Novyy Vovchynets, a village in Cherepkivtsi, Chernivtsi Raion